Waltraud is a given name. Notable people with the name include:

Waltraud Dietsch (born 1950), retired German sprinter who specialized in the 400 metres
Waltraut Haas (born 1927), Austrian stage and film actress and singer
Waltraud Kretzschmar (born 1948), former East German handball player
Waltraud Meier (born 1956), Grammy Award-winning German dramatic soprano and mezzo-soprano singer
Waltraud Pöhlitz (born 1942), German middle-distance runner who specialized in the 800 metres
Waltraud Schale, East German slalom canoeist who competed in the late 1950s
Waltraud Strotzer (born 1952), German middle-distance runner who specialized in the 800 metres

Fictional characters
Waltraud Nowotny, a fictional character from Strike Witches

German feminine given names